is a Japanese retired goalball player. She won a bronze medal at the 2004 Summer Paralympics with the Japanese team which also included her twin sister Yuki Naoi.

Like Yuki, she has retinitis pigmentosa. She developed symptoms when she was 20, and began playing goalball in around 1997.

References 

Paralympic bronze medalists for Japan
Goalball players at the 2004 Summer Paralympics
Sportspeople from Gunma Prefecture
1963 births
Living people
Medalists at the 2004 Summer Paralympics
Paralympic goalball players of Japan
Female goalball players
Japanese twins
Twin sportspeople
People from Maebashi
Paralympic medalists in goalball
21st-century Japanese women